George Crawford McKindsey (March 29, 1829 – February 12, 1901) was a Canadian politician.

Born in the Township of Trafalgar, Halton County, Ontario, of Irish parents who came to Canada and settled in the County of Halton in 1819, McKindsey was educated at the Common School and also by private tuition. He was Deputy Sheriff from July 1855 until October 1858, and Sheriff of the County of Halton from October 1858 until June 1882.

He was President of the Agricultural Association of Halton County, a Captain in the Militia and a Justice of the Peace. He ran twice unsuccessfully for the House of Commons of Canada in the 1872 election and 1882 election for the riding of Halton. He was appointed on the advice of John A. Macdonald to the Senate in January 1884 representing the senatorial division of Milton, Ontario.

A Conservative, he served 17 years until his death in 1901.

References

External links
 

1829 births
1901 deaths
Canadian senators from Ontario
Candidates in the 1872 Canadian federal election
Candidates in the 1882 Canadian federal election
Conservative Party of Canada (1867–1942) senators
Canadian people of Irish descent